The 2009 Porsche Mobil 1 Supercup season was the 17th Porsche Supercup season. The races were all supporting races in the 2009 Formula One season. The calendar went across Europe and to Bahrain and the United Arab Emirates in Asia. Jeroen Bleekemolen won the title, finishing every single race on the podium.

Teams and drivers
In the Porsche Supercup the 911 GT3 Cup type 997 is deployed - a car based on the Porsche 911 Carrera. All vehicles are technically identical: 450 hp, sequential six-speed gearbox, aero pack, Porsche Ceramic Composite Brake (PCCB), 1,200 kg. The PCCB is deployed exclusively in Porsche Supercup.

Race calendar and results

Championship standings

† — Drivers did not finish the race, but were classified as they completed over 90% of the race distance.

References

External links
The Porsche Mobil 1 Supercup website
Porsche Mobil 1 Supercup Online Magazine

Porsche Supercup seasons
Porsche Supercup